Karuvarakundu is a semi-urban area in the eastern part of Malappuram district, Kerala, India. The Olippuzha River, a tributary of the Kadalundipuzha, flows through the town. Karuvarakundu is close to the Western Ghats and hence prone to landslides. The Silent Valley National Park was included in Karuvarakundu until 1990's.

The name Karuvarakundu means place of the blacksmith, indicating the town's history as a metalworking centre. It is known as the Jamshedpur of south India because of its range of metal depositories.

There are many tea and rubber plantations in and around Karuvarakundu. The town is an educational centre of eastern Eranad, with a total of 20 schools and 5 colleges.

Karuvarakundu is part of the setting of the novel Arabi Ponnu, by M. T. Vasudevan Nair and N. P. Mohammed.

History 
"Karu" means iron ore. The place where iron ore was excavated came to be known as Karu varum kundu, later shortened to Karuvarakundu. Swords and utensils made of iron were made here two thousand years ago, and exported to countries like Egypt, Rome, and Denmark. The people engaged in iron ore mining took the family name Aripanikkar. Karuvarakundu is known as the Jamshedpur of south India because of its extensive mining history.

The Malabar rebellion of 1921 led to riots in Karuvarakundu. On 20 August 1921 the news that the British had fired at a mosque in Tirurangadi spread in Karuvarakundu, and protests against the British began. On the next day, a mob attacked the police station and seized weapons, leaving the police station and the tourist Bungalow on fire. The British army subsequently came to Karuvarakundu to suppress the rioters. The army barracks were first situated at Chembankunnu and later moved to Cambinkunnu, the current location of the Karuvarakundu Government Higher Secondary School.

Geography 
Karuvarakundu is located on a sloping region near a forest. The mountains of the Western Ghats, which reach a height of 1250 metres above sea level, are located in the southeast of the Karuvarakundu Panchayath. The Olippuzha river, the longest river flowing through Karuvarakundu, originates in these mountains. The river Kallanpuzha, which also flows through Karuvarakundu, originates at a height of 1050m.

The Karuvarakundu Panchayath covers an area 64.2 km2 and is part of the Nilambur subdivision of the Malappuram district. It is one of the main agricultural areas of the Malappuram district. It includes Kerala Estate, and shares borders with Amarambalam and Puthur (Palakkad) in the north, Puthur Panchayath in the east, Alanallur in the south and Kalikavu, Tuvvur, and Chokkad in the west.

Suburbs and Villages
 Chengode Bridge, Eanadi and Arimanal Bridge
 Pulvetta, Tharish, Kalkundu, Kakkara villages
 Kerala Village, Punnakkad Junction 
 Iringattiri Bridge, Puthanazhi.

Tourist attractions
 Keralamkundu Waterfalls
 Cherumb Eco Village
 Silent Valley National Park
 Anginda peak
 Thareeqath Dargah of late Hyderabadi saint
 Baroda waterfall
 Vattamala
 vattamala waterfall
 Madhari waterfall

Important landmarks

 Cherumbu Eco Village
 Govt. higher secondary school Karuvarakundu
 Cordova College for Women Karuvarakundu
 DNIC Arts and Science college
 Najath College of Science And Technology
 Shifa Acupuncture & Hijama Centre Maruthingal
 Hayath Hospital Maruthingal
 Alsalama Hospital
 Kalakuthilamma Muthappan Temple
 GHSS Karuvarakundu
 GLPS Punnakkad
 GLPS Pulvetta
 GLPS Tharish
 KTM College of Advanced Studies Punnakkad
 Nalanda College Angadi
 Sri Neelaam Kurushi Ayyappa Temple

Transportation
Karuvarakundu village is connected via road to the nearest towns, including Manjeri, Perinthalmanna and Nilambur. State Highway 39 (SH 39) between Perumbilavu and Nilambur passes through Karuvarakundu. It is also connected to National Highway No. 966, which connects Palakkad and Coimbatore. The nearest airport is at Karipur. The nearest railway stations are at Tuvvur and Melattur.

References

External links

Villages in Malappuram district
Manjeri